The 1921–22 Cornell Big Red men's ice hockey season was the 17th season of play for the program. The teams was coached by Nick Bawlf in his 2nd season.

Season

For the second season back, Cornell planned for a 7-game slate (only 5 were played), seeking to return to the upper ranks of college hockey. The team opened with three home wins against smaller schools before hitting the rod to end the season. After their win over Pennsylvania, the team met Yale and hoped to continue their unbeaten streak. Unfortunately, the Big Red were soundly beaten before a crowd of 3,000 on the strength of Joe Bulkley's 5-goal game. The following game with Hamilton was cancelled due to a lack of ice on Beebe Lake.

Roster

Standings

Schedule and Results

|-
!colspan=12 style=";" | Regular Season

† UMass records the game as being played on January 27 with the score 4–1 for Cornell.

References

Cornell Big Red men's ice hockey seasons
Cornell
Cornell
Cornell
Cornell